Mongyawng or Möngyawng was one of the Shan states. It was located in the narrow wedge of territory that projects eastwards from Kengtung State between China and Laos.

History
Mongyawng State was founded in the 18th century. It had its capital at Mong Yawng town. The state was inhabited mainly by Wa people. 

The state was occupied by Siam until 1814 and subsequently annexed by Kengtung State in 1815.

Rulers
The rulers of Mongyawng had the title Myoza.
c.17.. - 17..              Tao Luk
17.. - 17..                Tao Ngam   
17.. - 17..                Sunabnta
17.. - 17..                Sulang Ka Wutti
(17.. - ....                Inta Wasai 
.... - ....                .... 
.... - ....                Hsai Ya Kuman I
.... - ....                Hsen Sulin (Surin Pumintha) 
.... - ....                Hsai Ya Kuman II 
.... - ....                Sao Yawt
1814 - 1815                Maha Hkanan
1815                       Buddha Wong

See also
Mong Yawng Yazawin

References

External links
The Tai Of the Shan State
The Imperial Gazetteer of India

Shan States
Wa people

ca:Mongyawng